Dendrodorididae is a taxonomic family of sea slugs, dorid nudibranchs, marine gastropod molluscs in the Superfamily Phyllidioidea.

Genera 
A maximum-parsimony analysis of the nucleotide sequence of the 16S mtDNA gene, performed in 2003, has shown that the family Dendrodoridae is paraphyletic.
Genera in the family Dendrodorididae presently include:

 Dendrodoris Ehrenberg, 1831    
 Doriopsilla Bergh, 1880

References

 
 Powell A. W. B., New Zealand Mollusca, William Collins Publishers Ltd, Auckland, New Zealand 1979